"That's Why (I Love You So)" is a song written by Berry Gordy Jr. and Tyran Carlo and performed by Jackie Wilson.  It reached #2 on the U.S. R&B chart and #13 on the U.S. pop chart in 1959.  It was featured on his 1959 album Lonely Teardrops.

The song was arranged by Dick Jacobs.

The song ranked #90 on Billboard's Year-End Hot 100 singles of 1959.

Other versions
Cliff Bennett and the Rebel Rousers released a version of the song on their 1966 album Drivin' You Wild.
Steve Goodman released a version of the song on his 1979 album High and Outside.
The Temptations released a version of the song on their 1995 album For Lovers Only.
Syl Johnson released a version of the song on his 2015 album Complete Twinight Records 45s.
John Eddie and The Front Street Runners released a version of the song on their 2017 album Live at the London Victory Club '81.

References

1959 songs
1959 singles
Songs written by Berry Gordy
Songs written by Billy Davis (songwriter)
Jackie Wilson songs
The Temptations songs
Brunswick Records singles